Reading Hockey Club is a field hockey club based at Sonning Lane in the English town of Reading.  It is one of the most successful clubs in the United Kingdom with National League and Cup honours.

The Men's First Team play in the Men's England Hockey League and the Ladies 1st XI team play in the Women's England Hockey League.

RHC runs 11 men's teams, 6 ladies teams and has a flourishing junior section. The ages of players range from 5 to 70+ years old. RHC has over 400 senior and nearly 550 junior members and is based at a top class facility in Sonning Lane, where they have been since 1984. There are 2 pitches at the clubhouse, Sonning Lane Water and Sonning Lane Sand.

In 1997, Reading hosted the European Cup Winners Tournament, and more recently, Reading has hosted International matches, alongside charity matches for the Hockey For Heroes.

Players

Men's First Team Squad 2019–20 season

(captain)

Notable players

Men's internationals
/

/
 Lee Morton 
/
 Daniel Kyriakides
 Fred Newbold 

 Will Carter Keall
 Hardeep Jawanda
 Chris Newman
 Peter Scott 

 Chris Cargo
 John Jackson
 Stuart Loughrey

 Tommy Alexander 
 Tim Atkins 
 Duncan Riddell

 Austin Smith

Women's internationals
/
 
/
 Emily Maguire
/
 Sarah Jones

 Chantal de Bruijn

Major National Honours
National Champions
 1996-97 Men's League Champions
 2000–01 Men's League Champions
 2001–02 Men's League Champions
 2006–07 Men's League Champions
 2007–08 Men's League Champions
 2011–12 Men's League Champions
 2010–11 Women's League Champions
 2012–13 Women's League Champions

National Cup Winners
 1995-96 Men's National Cup Winners
 1998-99 Men's National Cup Winners
 1999-00 Men's National Cup Winners
 2002–03 Men's National Cup Winners
 2003–04 Men's National Cup Winners
 2005–06 Men's National Cup Winners
 2008–09 Men's National Cup Winners
 2014–15 Men's National Cup Winners
 2015–16 Men's National Cup Winners
 2017–18 Men's National Cup Winners

National Tournaments
2001-02 Men's Premiership Tournament Winners
2002-03 Men's Premiership Tournament Winners
2003-04 Men's Premiership Tournament Winners
2005-06 Men's Super Cup Winners

References

External links

 

 
English field hockey clubs
Hockey Club
Field hockey clubs established in 1904
1904 establishments in England